Etofylline nicotinate is a vasodilator.

References

Nicotinate esters
Xanthines
Vasodilators